Belenois hedyle, the western yellow caper white, is a butterfly in the family Pieridae. It is found in Guinea-Bissau, Guinea, Sierra Leone, Liberia, Ivory Coast, Ghana, Togo, Benin and western Nigeria. The habitat consists of edges of dry forests.

Subspecies
Belenois hedyle hedyle (eastern Ghana, Togo, Benin, western Nigeria)
Belenois hedyle ianthe (Doubleday, 1842) (Guinea-Bissau, Guinea, Sierra Leone)
Belenois hedyle rhena (Doubleday, 1846) (Sierra Leone, Liberia, Ivory Coast, western Ghana)

References

Seitz, A. Die Gross-Schmetterlinge der Erde 13: Die Afrikanischen Tagfalter. Plate XIII 14

Butterflies described in 1777
Pierini